"Prouder, Stronger, Better", commonly referred to by the name "Morning in America", is a 1984 political campaign television commercial, known for its opening line, "It's morning again in America." The ad was part of that year's presidential campaign of Republican Party candidate Ronald Reagan. It featured a montage of images of Americans going to work, and a calm, optimistic narration that suggested that the improvements to the U.S. economy since the 1980 election were due to Reagan's policies. It asked voters why they would want to return to the pre-Reagan policies of Democrats.

The phrase "It's morning again in America" is used both as a literal statement (people are shown going to work as they would in the morning), and as a metaphor for renewal.

Details
Full text of the ad: 

The ad was written and narrated by ad man Hal Riney, who also wrote and narrated Reagan's resonant "Bear in the woods" ad (titled "Bear") as well as his "America's Back" ad. To many, his rich, avuncular voice represented wholesomeness and authenticity. Bernie Vangrin of Hal Riney & Partners was the Art Director of the ad, which was directed and filmed by John Pytka of Levine/Pytka Productions.

Locations 
"Morning In America" was filmed in Petaluma, California.

Resonance
This advertisement won industry awards and praise from the political and advertising world. Republican strategist Dan Schnur said of Riney's work: "Most political advertising hits viewers over the head, while his work makes just as strong a point but in a less confrontational and a more soothing manner."

Adaptations and references
During Super Bowl LIII, Hulu aired a trailer for the third season of The Handmaid's Tale that was inspired by  "Morning in America". It used similar narration to the original commercial (with a particular focus on women and their newborn children), but is interrupted by scenes of the series' dystopian and totalitarian Republic of Gilead—where women are required to act as sex slaves—and concluding with lead character June Osbourne / Offred stating "Wake up America, morning's over."

2016 Presidential Election 
During the 2016 presidential primaries, Republican Party candidates Marco Rubio and Ted Cruz both referenced "morning in America" rhetoric in attempts to reflect the politics and spirit of Reagan. Rubio's "Morning Again in America" television ad, which features montage footage of everyday American life in both cities and suburbs, drew widespread criticism for opening with a shot of Vancouver, British Columbia, Canada. Ted Cruz used variations of the phrase throughout his campaign, often at concluding or climactic points in his speeches. After winning the Republican caucus in Iowa on February 1, 2016, Cruz said: "Tonight Iowa has proclaimed to the world: morning is coming." Cruz used the phrase again in a speech in South Carolina as he competed with Rubio for second place in the state's Republican primary election on February 20: "We can bring back morning in America", he declared. Years earlier, Cruz had used a similar line when he spoke at the 2014 Conservative Political Action Conference (CPAC): "We will bring back morning in America. That's why we're here and that's the future for the young and everybody else in this country."

In Hillary Clinton's Democratic nomination acceptance speech, referencing Donald Trump’s acceptance speech the previous week, she said: "He's taken the Republican Party a long way from 'Morning in America' to 'Midnight in America.' He wants us to fear the future and fear each other."

2020 Presidential Election 
During the 2020 presidential campaign, The Lincoln Project released the ad "Mourning in America"  with themes related to deaths from COVID-19 and the debatable inaction of Pres. Donald Trump; versions featuring specific states were released as "Mourning in Iowa", "Mourning in Florida", "Mourning in Pennsylvania" and "Mourning in Ohio", as well as a version called "Mourning in Republican Party" that laments the party's change of direction.

See also
1984 United States presidential election
Bear in the woods
Make America Great Again

References

External links
Morning in America— video of the original advertisement on YouTube
CNN AllPolitics Ad Archive — archive of political ads, including "Bear in the Woods" and "Morning in America"
"Creating Reagan's image" — the story of how Hal Riney developed the ad campaign
"Reagan's Paid Political Advertisements, Page Two"
"Morning in America: The Reagan Election" — background of 1984 election
Review of the book Morning in America: How Ronald Reagan Invented the 1980s
Ad Age: "Top 100 Advertising Campaigns" — "Morning in America" is 43.
 USA Today: "Voters in Ohio give political ads a thumbs down" uses "Prouder, Stronger, Better" as an expert's example of an ad that strikes a compelling theme.
 'boards magazine: "Why political TV ads suck so hard" cites "Bear" and "Prouder, Stronger, Better" as examples of effective and significant ads in contrast to recent ads.
 ReaganKnight blog includes compilation of links to 1984 'Morning in America' videos.
 Democrats Need 'Conviction Politics' Advocates "Morning in America" type ads for Democrats in 2008.
The Living Room Candidate - Commercials - 1984 - Train
The Daily Beast: "Hulu’s ‘Handmaid’s Tale’ Super Bowl Commercial Screams ‘Wake Up America’"

1980s television commercials
1984 in American television
1984 neologisms
1984 United States presidential election
1984 works
American political catchphrases
Films directed by Hal Riney
Political campaign advertisements
Ronald Reagan